WEER may refer to:

 WEER (FM), a radio station (88.7 FM) licensed to serve Montauk, New York, United States
 WEEG, a defunct radio station (90.7 FM) licensed to serve East Hampton, New York, United States which used the WEER call sign from 2008 to 2011
 Weer, a municipality in the district of Schwaz, Tyrol, Austria
 William Weer , a brigadier general in the Union Army during the American Civil War